The University of Johannesburg men's basketball team is the basketball team of the sports department of the University of Johannesburg. Several of the team's players belong to the elite of South Africa and have played for the South Africa national basketball team.

Notable players

 Masego Loate
 Amogelang Keogatile 
 Kegorapetse David Letsebe

References

External links 
 Official Web Site
  Presentation on Facebook

Sports teams in South Africa
Basketball in South Africa
Sport in Johannesburg
Basketball teams in South Africa